Cherlynne Theresa Thigpen (December 22, 1948 – March 12, 2003) was an American actress of stage and screen. She was known for her role as "The Chief" of ACME Crimenet in the game show Where in the World is Carmen Sandiego? and various spinoffs, and for her role as "Luna" (The Moon) in the Playhouse Disney children's series Bear in the Big Blue House. For her varied television work, Thigpen was nominated for six Daytime Emmy Awards. She won a Tony Award in 1997 for portraying Dr. Judith Kaufman in An American Daughter, and also played Ella Farmer on The District (2000–2003).

Early life and education
Thigpen was born in the Chicago suburb of Joliet, Illinois to George and Celia (Martin) Thigpen. She obtained a degree in teaching. She taught high school English briefly while studying theatre at the University of Illinois on an acting fellowship.

Career

Stage

Thigpen moved to New York City in 1971 to begin her career as a stage actress.  She had a long and prolific theater career and appeared in numerous musicals including Godspell, The Night That Made America Famous, The Magic Show, Working, Tintypes, and An American Daughter (for which she won her Tony Award for her portrayal of Dr. Judith Kaufman in 1997).

In 1995, she served as associate artistic director of the acclaimed off-Broadway theater, Circle Repertory Company, while Austin Pendleton served as artistic director.

Film

Her first feature film role was as Lynne in Godspell (1973), co-starring opposite Victor Garber and David Haskell. Thigpen also portrayed a radio DJ (shown only from the nose down) in Walter Hill's The Warriors (1979), and Leonna Barrett, the mother of an expelled student, in Lean on Me (1989), the story of American high school principal Joe Louis Clark. She had a role in the remake of Shaft (2000) as the mother of a murder victim, and played the Second President of the World Congress in Bicentennial Man (1999). Her last film, Anger Management (2003), starring Adam Sandler and Jack Nicholson, was released a month after her death and paid tribute to her in the end credits.

Television

Thigpen was best known to television audiences for playing "The Chief" in the PBS children's geography game show Where in the World Is Carmen Sandiego?, which involved education, humor, and an occasional musical performance. She also reprised her role as The Chief in the successor show Where in Time is Carmen Sandiego?. She also played Luna in the television show Bear in the Big Blue House and also appeared in many other television series during her career, most notably in a recurring role as Grace Keefer on the ABC daytime drama All My Children and a supporting role as Ella Mae Farmer, a crime analyst for the Washington, D.C., police department, on the CBS crime drama The District. She guest-starred in episodes of Gimme A Break!, L.A. Law, Law & Order, The Days and Nights of Molly Dodd, Homicide: Life on the Street, Sesame Street, and Thirtysomething, and was a regular cast member on the short-lived NBC sketch comedy series The News Is the News.

Audio productions

She appeared in radio skits of the Garrison Keillor program The American Radio Company of the Air. Her voice was also heard on over 20 audio books, primarily works with socially relevant themes.

Computer games 

In her association with the Where in the World Is Carmen Sandiego? television show, Thigpen reprised her role as The Chief in three related computer games.  Two were released in 1996: Where in the World Is Carmen Sandiego? (a reboot of the original 1985–1992 game) and Where in the U.S.A. Is Carmen Sandiego? The following year, a video game counterpart to the TV series' successor show, Where in Time is Carmen Sandiego, was released, titled Carmen Sandiego's Great Chase Through Time. Thigpen recorded hundreds of QuickTime videos for cut-scenes in the games, and generally received praise for her performances in them; in reviewing the 1997 game, David Colker of the Los Angeles Times enjoyed the "on-screen presence of actress Lynne Thigpen", noting that she "brings a winning presence to her role," while Debbie Maria Leon of the New Straits Times wrote that "the urgency of the [confident Chief's] voice [gives] enough oomph to make [the player] go scurrying to restore history".

Personal life 

According to Thigpen, she was a practicing Methodist and a lifelong liberal Democrat. In addition, she never married nor had any children due to the fact that she had no desire to have those titles in her life same as having to carry along the commitments that came with them.

Death
Thigpen died of a cerebral hemorrhage on March 12, 2003, in her Marina del Rey, California home, outside of Los Angeles, after complaining of headaches for several days. The coroner's autopsy found "acute cardiac dysfunction, non-traumatic systemic and spontaneous intraventricular hemorrhage, and hemorrhage in the brain." Thigpen was entombed at Elmhurst Cemetery in her hometown of Joliet, Illinois.

Response and legacy
Following Thigpen's death, the remaining three episodes of the third season of The District killed off her character, Ella Mae Farmer. Her death also led to a three-year hiatus of Bear in the Big Blue House'''s fourth season, and an unplanned film version of the show was put on hold. Two years after Thigpen's death, her Bear co-star Tara Mooney, who played the character Shadow, said in an interview with Ray D'Arcy on Today FM: "The crew's hearts just weren't in it anymore".

Thigpen's family and friends established a non-profit foundation, The Lynne Thigpen–Bobo Lewis Foundation, to help young actors and actresses learn to survive and succeed in New York theater and to mentor the next generation of Broadway stars.

Thigpen was posthumously nominated for a Daytime Emmy Award for voicing Luna the moon in Bear in the Big Blue House, but lost to Jeff Corwin for his eponymous wildlife reality series The Jeff Corwin Experience. Her final film, Anger Management, was dedicated to her memory. An elementary school in Thigpen's hometown of Joliet, Illinois, was named for her.

Filmography

Film

Television

Awards and honors
Awards 
1992 Obie Award – Boesman and Lena1997 Tony Award for Best Featured Actress in a Play – An American Daughter2000 Obie Award – Jar the FloorNominations
1987 Los Angeles Drama Critics Award – Fences1994, 1995, 1996 Daytime Emmy Awards for Outstanding Performer in a Children's Series – Where in the World Is Carmen Sandiego?1996 NAACP Image Awards for Informational Youth or Children's Series/Special – Where in the World Is Carmen Sandiego?1997 NAACP Image Awards for Outstanding Actress in a Daytime Drama Series – All My Children 1997, 1998 Daytime Emmy Awards for Outstanding Performer in a Children's Series – Where in Time Is Carmen Sandiego?2000 AudioFile Awards Golden Voices for the Year
2004 Daytime Emmy Awards for Outstanding Performer in a Children's Series – Bear in the Big Blue House'' (Posthumously nominated)

Honors
Lynne Thigpen Elementary School, Joliet, Illinois

References

External links

 
 
 
 
 Lynne Thigpen  Godspell Tributes Page
 

1948 births
2003 deaths
African-American actresses
African-American schoolteachers
American film actresses
American soap opera actresses
American stage actresses
American television actresses
Actresses from Illinois
Obie Award recipients
Actors from Joliet, Illinois
University of Illinois College of Fine and Applied Arts alumni
Tony Award winners
People from Marina del Rey, California
20th-century American actresses
20th-century African-American women
20th-century African-American people
21st-century African-American people
21st-century African-American women
American Methodists
Illinois Democrats
California Democrats